The New London County Rugby Football Club (NLCRFC) is a men’s rugby club playing in the New England Rugby Football Union Division 3. Matches are played in the Spring and Fall against sides from Connecticut, Maine, Massachusetts, New Hampshire, New York and Vermont. The NLCRFC is committed to upholding the tradition of rugby each and every Saturday afternoon through dedication and hard work.

Sports in Connecticut
Rugby union teams in Connecticut
2003 establishments in Connecticut
Rugby clubs established in 2003